Benjamin Rhodes (born 2 May 1983 in York) is an English retired footballer, having played for York City in the 2001–02 season.

External links

1983 births
Living people
Footballers from York
English footballers
Association football midfielders
York City F.C. players
English Football League players
21st-century English people